WVLE (99.3 FM, "99.3 Love FM") is a radio station licensed to serve Scottsville, Kentucky.  The station is owned by Skytower Communications Group, LLC.  It airs a soft adult contemporary music format.

The station was assigned these call letters by the U.S. Federal Communications Commission (FCC) on April 28, 1986.

Programming 
In addition to its usual soft AC music playlist, WVLE also broadcasts football and boys' and girls' basketball games involving the athletic programs of Allen County-Scottsville High School.

The audio of WVLE is also heard on North Central Telephone Cooperative cable channel 6.

Translators

References

External links
WVLE official website

VLE
Soft adult contemporary radio stations in the United States
Radio stations established in 1967
1967 establishments in Kentucky
Scottsville, Kentucky